The Gunbus 410 is a motorcycle produced by German company Leonhardt Manufacturing, and is described as "the world’s biggest running motorcycle". The Gunbus 410 is 3.47 metres long and is powered by a 410 cubic inch V-twin engine. The motorcycle's front wheel including its tire is 38 inches in diameter and 11 inches wide, and the rear wheel including its tire is 42 inches in diameter and 15 inches wide. The price of a Gunbus 410 production model is reported as US$350,000.

See also
 Dodge Tomahawk
 Bi-Autogo
 List of motorcycles by type of engine

References

Motorcycles introduced in 2013